Collectors, Forgers – And A Writer: A Memoir (1983) is a memoir written by American author James A. Michener.

A discussion of Michener's college years and some acquaintances and works that still influenced him later in his life and career.

Originally published by Targ Editions in 1983.

Republished in 1993 as a chapter of Literary Reflections.

References
 

1983 non-fiction books
American memoirs
Books by James A. Michener
Literary memoirs